Events in the year 2001 in Cyprus.

Incumbents 

 President: Demetris Christofias
 President of the Parliament: Yiannakis Omirou

Events 
Ongoing – Cyprus dispute

 27 May – AKEL, a communist party, won 20 of the 56 seats in the parliament following parliamentary elections. The voter turnout was 91.8%.

Deaths

References 

 
2000s in Cyprus
Years of the 21st century in Cyprus
Cyprus
Cyprus
Cyprus